Swithland Viaduct is a railway viaduct in Leicestershire that carries the former Great Central Main Line over Swithland Reservoir.  It is unusual in that it carries the line over a reservoir rather than a valley.  It actually consists of two separate viaducts, with an embankment over Brazil Island in the centre of the reservoir.  The line now carries the Great Central Railway. 

The viaducts (bridges No. 349 and 350) were constructed in c.1895/7 by Messrs John Aird & Sons, as a sub-contract to Henry Lovatt & Co. of Wolverhampton.  Lovatts were contracted to the Great Central to execute contract number 2 on their extension line to London, East Leake to Aylestone, but the Corporation of Leicester insisted that those portions of the work that could delay or hinder the completion of their new water works at Swithland were to be executed by the main contractors for that job.

The south viaduct has a skew girder section approximately halfway along its length, this having been provided to bridge the weir which separates the reservoir into two unequal portions.  As of September 2015 extensive maintenance work is being carried out on this span in order to replace wasted plates within the girders, and this work is expected to carry on until the end of the year.

Originally the lineside telegraph wires were carried along the eastern wall of the viaduct on wooden trunking, except where they were carried over the previously mentioned iron-girder span in structure 350.  A telegraph pole, sat on top of the masonry of the parapet wall and guyed appropriately, was provided a short distance from each end of this span, and the circuits were then carried over the span between the two poles.  Although little sign of these poles remains from on top of the viaduct, the remains of the guying on the exterior of the parapet wall can still be clearly seen from the reservoir.

As part of the resignalling of much of the GCML, carried out in the early 1940s by Westinghouse to increase capacity, cable hangers were installed on the western walls of the viaducts, and the new lineside signalling and power cables required by the work were strung along them.  This cable route was restored to work, albeit with new cables, during the recent resignalling of Swithland Sidings. As part of the same scheme a pair of mechanical signals (Swithland Sidings' Up Inner Distant and Up Outer Home) was installed on Brazil Island, between the two viaducts.  

Photography may be undertaken from the south from Main Street, or at very long range from the dam which carries Kinchley Lane.  If one has a lineside permit, one can walk south from Quorn and photograph trains coming north off the viaduct.  The viaduct itself however is out of bounds.  The best location is probably from the east at Kinchley Hill but there is no public access there (the land is owned by Severn Trent)

References

External links

Great Central Railway
Railway viaducts in Leicestershire
Great Central Railway (preserved)